Marks station is a passenger rail train station in Marks, Mississippi. The station is located on Amtrak's City of New Orleans line. The station opened on May 4, 2018.

The Illinois Central Gulf railroad did not operate passenger trains through Marks Mississippi before Amtrak, so there was no station here.
The development for the Marks train station is a culmination of two decades of work by civic leaders in Quitman County, Mississippi. Initially, $79,500 in funds from the City of Marks and Quitman County were used to construct a platform with wheelchair access and a glass and steel "Amshack" structure. County leaders had hoped the train stops would commence in September 1999. In 2010, Mississippi Senator Roger Wicker met with Canadian National Railway (CN) officials to negotiate a flag-stop in Marks. Senator Wicker announced in 2015 that an agreement had been reached by Quitman County, Amtrak, and Canadian National to establish a permanent stop in Marks. To construct the $1.2 million station, a number of grants were awarded. A $500,000 grant was allocated by the Federal Highway Administration (FHWA) via the Mississippi Department of Transportation (MDOT), a 20% matching grant from Mississippi Development Authority that was worth $150,000, and a $300,000 grant from the Delta Regional Authority. Groundbreaking for the station occurred in October 2016. The station's ribbon cutting and maiden stop took place on May 4, 2018.

References

External links 

Marks Amtrak Station (USA Rail Guide – Train Web)

Buildings and structures in Quitman County, Mississippi
Amtrak stations in Mississippi
Railway stations in the United States opened in 2018
2018 establishments in Mississippi